New Chester may refer to one of the following places:
Canada
New Chester, Nova Scotia
United States
New Chester, Wisconsin, a town
New Chester (ghost town), Wisconsin, a ghost town